The National Institute of Medical Herbalists (NIMH) is a professional body representing medical herbalists in the United Kingdom. It was first established as the National Association of Medical Herbalists in 1864, and now has members worldwide. As of 2020 it is the UK's largest and oldest regulator of herbal practitioners. Institute-registered medical herbalists are trained in the same diagnostic skills as mainstream doctors and take a holistic approach to health.

The Institute has over 600 practising and 500 non-practising and student members and is the organiser of the annual Herbal Medicine Conference.

References

External links
 
 Article

1864 establishments in the United Kingdom
Exeter
Health in Devon
Herbalism organizations
Medical and health organisations based in the United Kingdom
Organisations based in Devon
Medical Herbalists